Fausto Jorge Dias Lourenço (born 19 January 1987), known simply as Fausto, is a Portuguese footballer who plays for Anadia F.C. as a forward.

Club career
Fausto was born in Miranda do Corvo, Coimbra District. An unsuccessful youth graduate at FC Porto, he began his professional career with Académica de Coimbra, but never appeared officially for the team, going on to serve loans at third division sides G.D. Tourizense and Anadia FC.

In July 2008, Fausto moved to Bulgaria with FC Lokomotiv Mezdra in the First Professional Football League, failing to score as the club finished in eighth position. In the following years, he played in Cyprus and Switzerland.

References

External links

1987 births
Living people
People from Miranda do Corvo
Sportspeople from Coimbra District
Portuguese footballers
Association football forwards
Liga Portugal 2 players
Segunda Divisão players
Padroense F.C. players
Associação Académica de Coimbra – O.A.F. players
G.D. Tourizense players
Anadia F.C. players
Leixões S.C. players
C.D. Tondela players
Académico de Viseu F.C. players
S.C. Freamunde players
Vilaverdense F.C. players
Merelinense F.C. players
Gondomar S.C. players
First Professional Football League (Bulgaria) players
PFC Lokomotiv Mezdra players
Cypriot Second Division players
Onisilos Sotira players
Swiss Super League players
Neuchâtel Xamax FCS players
Kazakhstan Premier League players
FC Atyrau players
Portugal youth international footballers
Portuguese expatriate footballers
Expatriate footballers in Bulgaria
Expatriate footballers in Cyprus
Expatriate footballers in Switzerland
Expatriate footballers in Kazakhstan
Portuguese expatriate sportspeople in Bulgaria
Portuguese expatriate sportspeople in Cyprus
Portuguese expatriate sportspeople in Switzerland
Portuguese expatriate sportspeople in Kazakhstan